The Agony in the Garden is an early painting by the Italian Renaissance master Giovanni Bellini, who painted it around 1459–65. It is in the National Gallery, London.

It portrays Christ kneeling on the Mount of Olives in prayer, with his disciples Peter, James and John sleeping near to him. In the background, Judas leads the Roman soldiers to capture Christ.

The picture is closely related to the similar work by Bellini's brother-in-law, Andrea Mantegna, also in the National Gallery. It is likely that both derived from a drawing by Bellini's father, Jacopo. In Bellini's version, the treatment of dawn light has a more important role in giving the scene a quasi-unearthly atmosphere.

Until the mid-19th century Early Renaissance paintings were regarded as curiosities by most collectors. This one had probably belonged to Consul Smith in Venice (d. 1770), was bought by William Beckford at the Joshua Reynolds sale in 1795 for £5, then sold in 1823 with Fonthill Abbey and repurchased by Beckford at the Fonthill Sale the next year (as a Mantegna) for £52.10s.  It was bought by the National Gallery for £630 in 1863, still a low price for the day.

The painting was amongst five paintings including Bellini's Portrait of a Mathematician that was damaged in a suffragette protest by Grace Marcon (aka Frieda Graham) in 1914. She was sentenced to six months but she was released the next month weak from a hunger strike protest.

References

Reitlinger, Gerald; The Economics of Taste, Vol I: The Rise and Fall of Picture Prices 1760–1960, Barrie and Rockliffe, London, 1961

Footnotes

External links
Official website page
Agony in the Garden – Analysis
Web Gallery of Art

1450s paintings
Paintings by Giovanni Bellini
Collections of the National Gallery, London
Bellini
Angels in art
Paintings depicting Saint Peter
Paintings depicting John the Apostle